Nino Marchesini (1895 – 13 January 1961) was an Italian actor. He appeared in more than seventy films from 1931 to 1961.

Filmography

References

External links 

1895 births
1961 deaths
Italian male film actors